Iben Larsen is a former Danish curler.

At the national level, she is a three-time Danish women's champion curler (1979, 1983, 1984).

Teams

References

External links

Living people
Danish female curlers
Danish curling champions
Date of birth missing (living people)
Place of birth missing (living people)
Year of birth missing (living people)